A bodyguard (or close protection officer/operative) is a type of security guard, government law enforcement officer, or servicemember who protects a person or a group of people — usually witnesses, high-ranking public officials or officers, wealthy people, and celebrities — from danger: generally theft, assault, kidnapping, assassination, harassment, loss of confidential information, threats, or other criminal offences. The personnel team that protects a VIP is often referred to as the VIP's security detail.

Most important public figures, such as heads of state, heads of government, and governors are protected by several bodyguards or by a team of bodyguards from a government agency, security forces, or police forces (e.g., in the United States, the Secret Service or the Diplomatic Security Service of the State Department). In most countries where the head of state is also their military leader, the leader's bodyguards have traditionally been royal guards, republican guards and other military units. Less-important public figures, or those with lower risk profiles, may be accompanied by a single bodyguard who doubles as a driver.

A number of high-profile celebrities and CEOs also use bodyguards. In some countries or regions (e.g., in Latin America), wealthy people may have a bodyguard when they travel. In some cases, the security personnel uses an armoured vehicle, which protects them and the VIP. Emon

Roles

Popular misconceptions
 
The role of bodyguards is often misunderstood by the public, because the typical layperson's only exposure to body-guarding is usually in heavily dramatized action film depictions of the profession, such as the 2018 British TV series Bodyguard, in which bodyguards are depicted in firefights with attackers. In contrast to the exciting lifestyle depicted on the film screen, the role of a real-life bodyguard is much more mundane; it consists mainly of planning routes, pre-searching rooms and buildings where the client will be visiting, researching the background of people that will have contact with the client, searching vehicles, and attentively escorting the client on their day-to-day activities.

Breakdown of responsibilities
The role of a bodyguard depends on several factors. First, it depends on the role of a given bodyguard in a close protection team. A bodyguard can be a driver-bodyguard, a close-protection officer (who escorts the client), or part of an ancillary unit that provides support such as electronic "bug" detection, counter-sniper monitoring, pre-searching facilities, IED detection and background-checking people who will have contact with the client. Second, the role of a bodyguard depends on the level of risk that the client faces. A bodyguard protecting a client at high risk of assassination will be focusing on very different roles (e.g., checking cars for IED devices, bombs, watching for potential shooters, etc.) than a bodyguard escorting a celebrity who is being stalked by aggressive tabloid photographers (e.g., the role will be to ask the photographers to maintain their distance and block the path of aggressive cameramen). Some bodyguards specialize in the close-quarter protection of children of VIPs, to protect them from kidnapping or assassination.

Driving
In some cases, bodyguards also drive their clients. Normally, it is not sufficient for a client to be protected by a single driver-bodyguard, because this would mean that the bodyguard would have to leave the car unattended when they escort the client on foot. If the car is left unattended, this can lead to several risks: an explosive device may be attached to the car; an electronic "bug" may be attached to the car; the car may be sabotaged; the car may be stolen; or city parking officials may simply tow away the vehicle or place a wheel clamp on the tire. If parking services tow away or disable the car, then the bodyguard cannot use the car to escape with the client in case there is a security threat while the client is at their meeting.

The driver should be trained in evasive driving techniques, such as executing short-radius turns to change the direction of the vehicle, high-speed cornering, and so on. The car used by the client will typically be a large sedan with a low center of gravity and a powerful engine. In some countries, large SUVs such as Chevrolet Suburbans are used for VIPs. At a minimum, the vehicle should have ballistic glass in the windows, some type of armor reinforcement to protect the client from gunfire, and a foam-filled gas tank. "Run-flat tires" (which have either extremely stiff sidewalls or a resilient filler to allow driving a limited distance while flat, usually at reduced speed, without permanent damage or hazard) and armor protection for the driver are also desirable.

The car may also be equipped with an additional battery; dual foot-pedal controls, such as those used by driving instruction companies (in case the driver is wounded or incapacitated), a PA system with a microphone and a megaphone mounted on the outside of the car so that the driver can give commands to other convoy vehicles or bodyguards who are on foot; fire extinguishers inside the vehicle in case the vehicle is struck by an incendiary weapon (such as a Molotov cocktail); a reinforced front and rear bumper, to enable the driver to ram attacking vehicles; and additional mirrors, to give the driver a better field of view. In Latin American countries, many armored cars will come with a siren and lights to use in situations where they need to get out of places quickly. Decoy convoys and vehicles are used to prevent tailing. In the event the convoy holding the client is compromised and ambushed, decoy convoys can also act as a reinforcement force that can counter-attack a force that is attacking the primary convoy. Some clients rotate between residences in different cities when attending public events or meetings to prevent being tailed home or to a private location.

Weapons and weapon tactics

Depending on the laws in a bodyguard's jurisdiction and on which type of agency or security service they are in, bodyguards may be unarmed, armed with a less-lethal weapon such as a pepper spray, an expandable baton, or a Taser (or a similar type stun gun), or with a lethal weapon such as a handgun, or, in the case of a government bodyguard for a Secret Service-type agency, a machine pistol. Some bodyguards such as those protecting high ranking government officials or those operating in high-risk environments such as war zones may carry assault rifles.

In addition to these weapons, a bodyguard team may also have more specialist weapons to aid them in maintaining the safety of their protectee, such as sniper rifles and anti-materiel rifles (for anti-sniper protection) or shotguns.

Osama bin Laden's personal security detail consisted of "bodyguards...personally selected by him." Their "arsenal included SAM-7 and Stinger missiles, AK-47s, RPGs, and PK machine guns."

Bodyguards that protect high-risk clients may wear body armor such as kevlar or ceramic vests. The bodyguards may also have other ballistic shields, such as Kevlar-reinforced briefcases or clipboards which, while appearing innocuous, can be used to protect their client. The client may also wear body armor in high-risk situations.

Counter-sniper weapons and tactics

For a close protection officer, the primary tactic against sniper attacks is defensive: avoid exposing the client to the risk of being fired upon. This means that the client should ideally be within an armored vehicle or a secure structure. As well, when the client moves between a vehicle and a building, the client must be moved quickly to minimize the time window in which a sniper could take a shot and use a flanking escort of close protection officers to block the view of the sniper and any potential shot that the sniper may take. The use of offensive tactics against snipers will occur very rarely in a bodyguard context because it is very difficult for bodyguards to attempt to locate and fire back at a distant, concealed, or camouflaged sniper, even if the security detail has a carbine rifle or scoped sniper rifle in the trunk of the car.

Daily tasks
A bodyguard team protecting a high-profile politician who is at risk of attack would be based around escorting the client from a secure residence (e.g., an embassy) to the different meetings and other activities they have to attend during the day (whether professional or social), and then to escort the client back to their residence.

Planning and assigning responsibilities
The day would begin with a meeting of the bodyguard team led by the team leader. The team would review the different activities that the client plans to do during the day, and discuss how the team would undertake the different transportation, escorting, and monitoring tasks. During the day, the client may have to travel by car, train, and plane and attend a variety of functions, including meetings and invitations for meals at restaurants, and do personal activities such as recreation and errands.

Over the day, the client will be exposed to a range of risk levels, ranging from higher risk (meeting and greeting members of the public at an outdoor rally) to low risk (dining at an exclusive, gated country club with high security).

Some planning for the day would have begun on previous days. Once the itinerary is known, one or more bodyguards would travel the route to the venues, to check the roads for unexpected changes (road work, detours, closed lanes) and to check the venue. The venue needs to be checked for bugs and the security of the facility (exits, entrances) needs to be inspected. As well, the bodyguards will want to know the names of the staff who will have contact with the client, so that a simple electronic background check can be run on these individuals.
Bodyguards often have training in firearms tactics, unarmed combat, tactical driving, and first aid. In multi-agent units (like those protecting a head of state), one or more bodyguards may have training in specific tasks, such as providing a protective escort, crowd screening and control, or searching for explosives or electronic surveillance devices ("bugs"). Bodyguards also learn how to work with other security personnel to conduct threat or risk assessment and analyze potential security weaknesses.

Bodyguards learn how to examine a premises or venue before their clients arrive, to determine where the exits and entrances are, find potential security weaknesses, and meet the staff (so that a would-be attacker cannot pose as a staff member). As well, some bodyguards learn how to do research to be aware of potential threats to their client, by doing a thorough assessment of the threats facing the client, such as a protest by a radical group or the release from custody of a person who is a known threat. Close protection officers also learn how to escort a client in potentially threatening situations such as crowds that become unruly.

The military forces in many countries offer close protection training for the members of their own armed forces who have been selected to work as bodyguards to officers or heads of state (for example, the British 22nd Special Air Service Regiment). As well, there are a number of private bodyguards training programs, which offer training in all aspects of close protection and including the legal aspects of body-guarding (e.g., use of force, use of deadly force); how to escort clients; driving; searching facilities and vehicles, and so on.

Searching vehicles

An hour prior to leaving with the client to their first appointment, the driver-bodyguard and another bodyguard remove the cars that will be used to transport the client from the locked garage and inspect them. There may be only one car for a lower-risk client. A higher-risk client will have additional cars to form a protective convoy of vehicles that can flank the client's vehicle. The vehicles are inspected before leaving.

Transferring client to vehicle
Once the cars have been inspected and they are deemed to be ready for use, they are brought into position near the exit door where the client will leave the secure building. At least one driver-bodyguard stays with the cars while waiting because the now-searched cars cannot be left unattended. If the convoy is left unattended, an attacker could attach an IED or sabotage one or more of the cars. Then the bodyguard team flanks the client as they move from the secure residence to the car.
This moment is considered critical, as 60% of such attacks happen when the protected person is in or around the vehicle. Once this sort of attack is perpetrated, 75% of them are successful.

Travelling
The convoy then moves out towards the destination. The team will have chosen a route or two and in some cases, it may involve three routes that are designated for travel along, which avoids the most dangerous "choke points", such as one-lane bridges or tunnels, because these routes have no way of escape and they are more vulnerable to ambush. In some cases, if the client has to travel by train, the bodyguards will inspect the rail car they are traveling in and the other cars they will use. Traveling on foot to a destination is very dangerous because of the lack of cover and control over the environment.

Arrival at destination

When the convoy arrives at the location, one or more bodyguards will exit first to confirm that the location is secure and that the staff who were booked to work that day are the ones who are present. If the location is secure, these bodyguards signal that it is safe to bring in the client. The client is escorted into the building using a flanking procedure. If the client is attending a private meeting inside the building, and the building itself is secure (controlled entrances) the client will not need to have a bodyguard escort in the building. The bodyguards can then pull back to monitor the client's safety from a further distance. Bodyguards could monitor entrances and exits and the driver-bodyguard watches the cars.

If the client is moving about in a fairly controlled environment such as a private golf course, which has limited entrances and exits, the security detail may drop down to one or two bodyguards, with the other bodyguards monitoring the entrances to the facility, the cars, and remaining in contact with the bodyguards escorting the client. Throughout the day, as the client goes about their activities, the number of bodyguards escorting the client will increase or decrease according to the level of risk.

Return to secure location
After the day's activities, the client will be brought back to the secure residence location. Exiting from the vehicle and walking to the door exposes the client to risk, so the distance is kept as short as possible to cut down the time it takes to reach the door. Once the client is inside, the bodyguards assigned to the overnight detail will take up their positions outside or inside the residence. The vehicles are then parked in a locked garage (to prevent tampering, sabotage, or IED placement). Some team members may spend additional time doing maintenance on the equipment used by the team. The TL (team leader) will ensure that all equipment is checked and packed away for the next day and ensure the radios are being charged for the next day's operation.

Job requirements

Bodyguards often work long shifts in order to provide 24-hour protection, and shifts often include evenings, weekends, and holidays. Since bodyguards follow their clients throughout their daily activities, the work locations may range from indoor office meetings or social events to outdoor rallies or concerts. Bodyguards often have to travel by car, motorcycle, train, and airplane to escort their client. In some cases, international travel is required, which means that a bodyguard must have appropriate travel documentation.

Bodyguards often have backgrounds in the armed forces, police or security services, although this is not required. The exception to this is in the case of bodyguards protecting heads of state; in some countries, these bodyguards must be trained in military bodyguard training programs. Military experience in foot patrol and convoy escort through urban areas in conflict or war as in Afghanistan, Iraq, West Bank, Northern Ireland, Beirut and Basque country is considered to provide the expertise that may be difficult to replicate in training.

Bodyguards must be physically fit, with good eyesight and hearing, and they need to have a presentable appearance, especially for close protection work for dignitaries and heads of state. A driver's license is usually required so that the bodyguard can double as a driver. In the United Kingdom and some other countries, bodyguards have to have a license or certification with the SIA, which involves identity and criminal record checks. To be a bodyguard in an agency protecting a head of state, a bodyguard will have to undergo extensive background and loyalty checks.

Bodyguards need to be observant, and retain their focus on their job, despite distractions such as fatigue. As well, they need to be able to work as member of a team, with assigned tasks, or be able to act independently, and adapt and improvise an appropriate response if the need arises. Bodyguards need to be able to recognize potentially dangerous situations and remain calm under pressure. A bodyguard has to have a strong dedication to their protective role. Since bodyguards often have to collaborate or coordinate their protection with other security forces, such as local police and other private security guards, bodyguards need good interpersonal and communications skills. Since bodyguards accompany their clients throughout their day, the bodyguard will be privy to the private life of the client, which means that a bodyguard has to show discretion and maintain confidentiality.

Close protection training

Bodyguards often have training in firearms tactics, unarmed combat, tactical driving, and first aid. In multi-agent units (like those protecting a head of state) one or more bodyguards may have training in specific tasks, such as providing a protective escort, crowd screening and control, or searching for explosives or electronic surveillance devices ("bugs"). Bodyguards also learn how to work with other security personnel to conduct threat or risk assessment and analyze potential security weaknesses.

Bodyguards learn how to examine premises or venue before their clients arrive, to determine where the exits and entrances are, find potential security weaknesses, and meet the staff (so that a would-be attacker cannot pose as a staff member). As well, some bodyguards learn how to do research to be aware of potential threats to their client, by doing a thorough assessment of the threats facing the client, such as a protest by a radical group or the release from custody of a person who is a known threat. Close protection officers also learn how to escort a client in potentially threatening situations.

The military forces in many countries offer close protection training for the members of their own armed forces who have been selected to work as bodyguards to officers or heads of state (e.g., the British RMP – Royal Military Police, Close Protection Unit). In the private sector, there are a vast number of private bodyguard training companies, which offer training in all aspects of close protection relative to their local laws and threat level, including the legal aspects of physical protection (e.g., use of force, use of deadly force), how to escort clients, driving drills, searching facilities and vehicles, etc.

In the United Kingdom, the industry is highly regulated by the Security Industry Authority and requires an individual to obtain a level 3 vocational close protection qualification and pass an enhanced criminal record background check in addition to attending a recognized first-aid course prior to a license being issued. Most UK security firms will request that operatives hold an SIA license, even if operations are conducted outside of the UK. The SIA model has been adopted and modified by nearby countries Ireland and France. In France bodyguards require a CNAPS (Conséil National des Activitées Privée de Sécurité) license to operate legally as a bodyguard. Both the SIA and CNAPS have come under heavy criticism over the years for failing to assist license holders and meet their primary objectives of "raising the standards" in the private security industry.

In other countries with no specific regulations, training providers are allowed to shape their programs according to their needs. Heavy focus on physical training and shooting, neglecting intelligence and the strategic part of the job for marketing reasons, has been recently criticized as useless and called "bodyguard amusement tourism" by the International Association of Personal Protection Agents (IAPPA).

Notable organizations

In countries where the head of state is a military leader or dictator, the leader's bodyguards may also be part of an elite military unit. Such was the case with the Somatophylakes in Macedon, Schutzstaffel in Nazi Germany, the former Iraqi Special Republican Guard, or the Praetorian Guard in the Roman Empire and its later iteration as the Varangian Guard in the Byzantine period, or the Housecarls of Scandinavia and then Anglo-Saxon England.

The British monarch has at least three traditional bodyguard corps in service, known collectively as the Sovereign's Bodyguard.

In India, VIPs are protected by the National Security Guards (NSG), an elite Counter-terror unit as well as Central Paramilitary Forces like the Central Reserve Police Force (CRPF) and the Central Industrial Security Force (CISF) all operating under the Ministry of Home Affairs (India). The protection of the Prime Minister and the Prime Minister's immediate family members are entrusted with the Special Protection Group (SPG). SPG was formed as a specialized unit in the protection of the Prime Minister and his family members, after the assassination of the then Prime Minister Indira Gandhi, in 1984. Former Prime Ministers also get the protection of SPG for a period of 5 years, after stepping down from the post. The President's Bodyguards, which is a mechanized regiment of the Indian Army is the ceremonial bodyguard of the President of India. Persons with lower threat levels are given security cover by Delhi police in the Capital and respective state police forces elsewhere.

In Pakistan, the President and Prime Minister receive close protection teams from the military's elite Special Service Group unit. President Pervez Musharraf, as civilian head of state, was due to have this withdrawn after retiring as Chief of Army Staff, but the Pakistan Army has retained his close protection unit.

In Turkey, there are two main services tasked with close protection. The Prime Minister of Turkey is protected by the Karşı Saldırı Timi'nde (KST), an elite counterattack team, a subunit of the Office for Protection of the Prime Minister (Başbakanlık Koruma Dairesi Başkanlığı). The Office for Protection of the PM is itself a service of the General Directorate of Security (Emniyet Genel Müdürlüğü), the civil police force of Turkey. The President is closely protected by the Cumhurbaskanligi Muhafiz Alayi, the 2,500-strong Presidential Guard Regiment of the Turkish Army, subordinated to the 4th Army Corps. It consists of specially selected personnel and is charged with the duty of protecting the President (and members of his family), security of the Presidential palaces, and also the manning of the Turkish President's mode of transport (e.g., pilots for TC-ANA, the presidential plane etc.).

In the United States, the Secret Service safeguards the lives of the President, his family, and other executive officials, including former presidents and vice-presidents, the latter for a limited time. Another agency, the State Department's Bureau of Diplomatic Security, is responsible for protecting U.S. missions and their personnel overseas, as well as selected dignitaries in the U.S., including the Ambassador to the United Nations, the Secretary of State, and visiting foreign dignitaries other than heads of state. While the Secret Service's close-protection role is its most visible, its historic role as agents of the United States Treasury (although they are now agents of the Department of Homeland Security). 

In the UK during 1913–1914, the suffragette movement protested in an attempt to gain women the right to vote. After suffragette leaders were threatened, activists formed an all-female close protection unit to protect the leaders of the Women's Social and Political Union both from harassment by the general public and from arrest under the so-called Cat and Mouse Act. In the modern UK, the Royalty and Diplomatic Protection Department of the Metropolitan Police is responsible for the security of the Sovereign.

In the Vatican, the Pope and other senior Vatican officials are protected by the Pontifical Swiss Guard, Swiss mercenary soldiers who act as bodyguards, ceremonial guards, and palace guards. After the May 13, 1981, assassination attempt on Pope John Paul II by Mehmet Ali Ağca, the guards were given enhanced training in unarmed combat and firearm use. The pope's chief bodyguard is the Inspector General of the Corps of Gendarmerie of Vatican City.

In the late twentieth and early twenty-first centuries, most bodyguards are former or current police officers, or sometimes former military or other government agency personnel.

In fiction

Novels and stories
The brave and fiercely protective bodyguard who is willing to die to protect his master has long been depicted in fiction. The character of the Scottish hero Quentin Durward appears in stories as the bodyguard of the King of France. The character Charles d'Artagnan appears in stories as the bodyguard of the French Crown. The character Atticus Kodiak is a professional bodyguard who acts as narrator and protagonist in a series of novels by Greg Rucka. Bodyguards also appear in Usagi Yojimbo, Stan Sakai's anthropomorphic-rabbit samurai based upon Miyamoto Musashi and in the Artemis Fowl series of children's books.

Films and television
Bodyguards are also depicted in a number of films and television programs. In an episode of Star Trek: TOS entitled “Mirror, Mirror”, Captain Kirk and his landing party are exchanged with their counterparts from a savage parallel universe.  Aboard the Imperial Enterprise, junior officers conspire to assassinate senior officers as a means of advancing in rank. Therefore, the Imperial Kirk is shadowed by a number of (presumably very well paid) security officers loyal only to him.  He refers to these men as his “personal guard”.

Japanese director Akira Kurosawa's film Yojimbo depicts a samurai bodyguard in Japan. The Bodyguard (1992) is a film about a bodyguard who protects a celebrity singer. Gogo Yubari is O-Ren Ishii's bodyguard in the film Kill Bill: Volume 1. In the science-fiction/fantasy Star Wars films, MagnaGuards are General Grievous' bodyguards. Being a bodyguard is also a duty performed on special occasions by the Jedi Knights. In the film Lord of War, the main character's brother protects him while he makes arms deals in war-torn countries.

In the motion picture My Bodyguard (1980), high school student Clifford Peache (Chris Makepeace) is bullied by Melvin Moody (Matt Dillon).  Clifford asks school outcast Ricky Linderman (Adam Baldwin) to be his bodyguard. In the action-comedy film Shanghai Noon, martial arts star Jackie Chan plays the role of an Imperial Guard of China on a mission to America to help rescue a princess.

In the film Man on Fire (2004), John Creasy (Denzel Washington) is a burnt-out ex-CIA officer and counter-insurgency operative who grudgingly becomes the bodyguard of a young girl (played by Dakota Fanning). When kidnappers attempt to snatch the girl, Creasy is severely wounded in a gun battle. The film depicts his perseverance in attempting to continue to protect the girl despite his gunshot wounds until he becomes unconscious. When he recovers, he goes on a revenge rampage in Mexico City. The character Sam, in the Netflix film Close, is another bodyguard who perseveres in protecting her client after being injured in the line of duty.

Several films have been made about the Secret Service's role in guarding the President of the United States, such as In the Line of Fire and The Sentinel.

Bodyguards are also depicted in television shows, comics, and other media. Bodyguard is a Japanese television series starring Reiko Takashima. In the UK, Bodyguards was a late 1990s British television series about a specialized Close Protection Group that protected members of the UK government. More recently, Bodyguard follows the story of a war veteran suffering from PTSD who becomes a specialist protection officer in the Metropolitan Police Service, and assigned to protect an ambitious Cabinet minister.

On the E! television series The Royals (2015–present), HRH Prince Liam Henstridge (William Moseley) is protected by Marcus Jeffrys (Ukweli Roach), his no-nonsense bodyguard and confidante.  Moreover, Liam's sister, HRH Princess Eleanor Henstridge (Alexandra Park) is protected by bodyguard Jasper Frost (Tom Austen) – who is also blackmailing her for sex and having an affair with HRH Queen Helena Henstridge (Elizabeth Hurley) on the side.

Video games
In the Mortal Kombat fighting game series, Sheeva is the personal protector of Sindel. Suki is a Japanese manga about a relationship between a teenage girl and a 32-year-old bodyguard. In the 2009 videogame Grand Theft Auto: The Ballad of Gay Tony, the main character Luis Fernando Lopez works as a bodyguard for the nightclub owner Anthony "Gay Tony" Prince. In the 2012 video game Dishonored, the player takes the role of Corvo Attano, a bodyguard of Empress Jessamine Kaldwin, and gets framed for her murder. In the 2011 video game Witcher 2: Assassins of Kings, the player takes the role of Geralt of Rivia, a professional monster slayer who begins the story as a reluctant bodyguard of King Foltest of Temeria.

Comics and graphic novels
 The Human Target is an American comic book and television series about a bodyguard who also works as a private detective who impersonates his client to draw his would-be murderer's attention. The 2015 graphic novel trilogy Suffrajitsu: Mrs. Pankhurst's Amazons features a team of suffragette bodyguards inspired by the real-life close-protection team who protected the leaders of the radical women's suffrage movement from arrest and assault.
 The long-running Independent furry comic book, Usagi Yojimbo ("Rabbit Bodyguard" in English), has the lead character, Miyamoto Usagi, is a ronin in a fantasy Feudal Japan who takes freelance bodyguard jobs when possible.

See also
 List of notable bodyguards
 List of protective service agencies
 Private investigator
 Private military company
 United States Secret Service
 Secret Service
 Security detail
 Security police—persons who guard government property.

Particular kinds
 Antrustion, the bodyguards of the Merovingian kings
 Praetorian Guard, the bodyguards of the Roman Emperors
 Rynda, ceremonial bodyguard of early Russian tsars
 Somatophylakes, the Macedonian bodyguard of Alexander the Great
 Spatharios, the inner circle bodyguard of Eastern Roman (Byzantine) Emperors
 Yojimbo, the Japanese word for bodyguard

References

Protective service occupations
 
Law enforcement occupations
Military personnel
Security guards